The 1946–47 Challenge Cup was the 46th staging of rugby league's oldest knockout competition, the Challenge Cup.

First round

Second round

Quarterfinals

Semifinals

Final

Leeds reached the Wembley final for the second time, doing so without conceding a single point in the final five rounds of the tournament. However Bradford Northern beat Leeds 8-4 in the final in front of a crowd of 77,605. Trevor Foster and Emlyn Walters scored Bradford's tries and were converted by Ernest Ward. Willie Davies, Bradford Northern's stand-off half back, won the Lance Todd Trophy for man of the match.

This was Bradford's third Cup final win in five Final appearances including one win and one loss during World War II.

References

Challenge Cup
Challenge Cup